Cachoeirinha is a city in the Brazilian state of Rio Grande do Sul.

Cachoeirinha may also refer to:
 Cachoeirinha, Tocantins
 Cachoeirinha, Pernambuco
 Cachoeirinha River
 Cachoeirinha (district of São Paulo)